Chuave District is a district of the Simbu Province of Papua New Guinea.  Its capital is Chuave.  The population was 39,021 at the 2011 census.

References

Districts of Papua New Guinea
Chimbu Province